The 2006–07 Maltese FA Trophy (known as U*BET FA Trophy for sponsorship reasons) was the 69th season since its establishment. The competition started on 28 October 2006 and ended on 25 May 2007 with the final, which Hibernians won after the penalties against Sliema Wanderers.

First round

|colspan="3" style="background:#fcc;"|28 October 2006

|-
|colspan="3" style="background:#fcc;"|29 October 2006

|-
|colspan="3" style="background:#fcc;"|4 November 2006

|-
|colspan="3" style="background:#fcc;"|5 November 2006

|}

Second round

|colspan="3" style="background:#fcc;"|17 February 2007

|-
|colspan="3" style="background:#fcc;"|18 February 2007

|}

Quarter-finals

|colspan="3" style="background:#fcc;"|7 April 2007

|-
|colspan="3" style="background:#fcc;"|8 April 2007

|}

Semi-finals

Final

References

External links
 RSSSF page

Malta
Maltese FA Trophy seasons
Cup